Mekmen Ben Amar is a district in Naâma Province, Algeria. It was named after its capital, Mekmen Ben Amar.

Municipalities
The district is further divided into 2 municipalities:
Mekmen Ben Amar
Kasdir

 
Districts of Naâma Province